Scissor gait is a form of gait abnormality primarily associated with spastic cerebral palsy. That condition and others like it are associated with an upper motor neuron lesion.


Presentation
This gait pattern is reminiscent of a marionette.  Hypertonia in the legs, hips and pelvis means these areas become flexed to various degrees, giving the appearance of crouching, while tight adductors produce extreme adduction, presented by knees and thighs hitting, or sometimes even crossing, in a scissors-like movement while the opposing muscles, the abductors, become comparatively weak from lack of use. Most common in patients with spastic cerebral palsy, the individual is often also forced to walk on tiptoe unless the plantarflexor muscles are released by an orthopedic surgical procedure.

These features are most typical with the scissors gait and usually result in some form and to some degree regardless of the mildness or severity of the spastic CP condition:
 rigidity and excessive adduction of the leg in swing
 plantar flexion of the ankle
 flexion at the knee
 adduction and internal rotation at the hip
 progressive contractures of all spastic muscles
 complicated assisting movements of the upper limbs when walking.

Conditions associated with a scissor gait
 Arthrogryposis
 Spastic diplegia
 Pernicious anemia
 Cerebrovascular accident
 Cervical spondylosis with myelopathy (a problem with the vertebrae in the neck)
 Liver failure
 Multiple sclerosis
 Spinal cord trauma
 Spinal cord tumor
 Syphilitic meningomyelitis
 Syringomyelia
 other forms of Cerebral palsy

References

Cerebral palsy types
Gait abnormalities